Southern High School is a public high school in Racine, (Meigs County), Ohio, United States.  It is the only high school in the Southern Local School District.  Their mascot is the Tornado, and their official school colors are Purple and Gold.

Athletics

The Tornadoes belong to the Ohio High School Athletic Association (OHSAA) and the Tri-Valley Conference, a 16-member athletic conference located in southeastern Ohio.  The conference is divided into two divisions based on school size.  The Ohio Division features the larger schools and the Hocking Division features the smaller schools, including Southern.

Rival: Reedsville Eastern Eagles

See also 
 Ohio High School Athletic Conferences

References

External links
 

High schools in Meigs County, Ohio
Ohio high school sports conferences
Public high schools in Ohio